Kolbeinn Þórðarson (anglicized Thordarson) (born 12 March 2000) is an Icelandic professional footballer who plays as a midfielder for Lommel.

Club career
Kolbeinn played his first senior team games in 2017 with Breiðablik. In July 2019, Kolbeinn signed a three-year contract with Lommel.

International career
He made his debut for Iceland national football team on 8 June 2021 in a friendly against Poland. He substituted Aron Gunnarsson in the 87th minute of a 2–2 away draw.

Career statistics

Club

Notes

References

2000 births
Living people
Kolbeinn Thordarson
Kolbeinn Thordarson
Kolbeinn Thordarson
Kolbeinn Thordarson
Kolbeinn Thordarson
Kolbeinn Thordarson
Lommel S.K. players
Challenger Pro League players
Kolbeinn Thordarson
Kolbeinn Thordarson
Expatriate footballers in Belgium
Association football midfielders